HAS or Has may refer to:

Organizations
 Hawaii Audubon Society, bird conservation organization in Hawaii
 Hellenic Actuarial Society, association of actuaries in Greece
 Hubbard Association of Scientologists International, corporation founded in 1954 by L. Ron Hubbard
 Hungarian Academy of Sciences, learned society of Hungary

People
 Wojciech Has (1925–2000), Polish film director, screenwriter and film producer
 Has Catley (1915 – 1975), Rubgy union hooker from New Zealand

Places
 Has District, a district in Kukës County, Albania
 Has (municipality), a municipality in Kukës County, Albania
 Has (region), a region in Albania and Kosovo
 Has, Novi Travnik, a village in Bosnia and Herzegovina

Transportation
 Ha'il Regional Airport, the IATA code for the airport in Saudi Arabia
 Hageland Aviation Services, a regional airline in Anchorage, Alaska
 Hardened aircraft shelters, a reinforced hangar to house and protect military aircraft
 Hastings (Amtrak station), Nebraska, Amtrak station code HAS
 Hokkaido Air System, an airline at Okadama Airport, Okadama-chō, Higashi-ku, Sapporo
 Hong Kong Airport Services, airport services in Hong Kong

Other
 HAS (NASDAQ), Hasbro's NASDAQ symbol
 Hana Academy Seoul, a private high school in Seoul, South Korea
 Hsinchu American School, an international school in Hsinchu City, Taiwan
 Hôpital Albert Schweitzer Haiti, a hospital in Deschapelles, Haiti
 Helium atom scattering, a surface analysis technique used in materials science
 Hyaluronan synthase (HAS) or HA synthase,  an enzyme
 HAS PARTİ, an abbreviation used by the People's Voice Party of Turkey
 HAS enzyme, short for Hyaluronan synthase enzyme

See also
 Have (disambiguation)
 Hass (disambiguation)
 Haas (disambiguation)